A Ghost in Monte Carlo is a 1951 novel by Barbara Cartland.

It was the gayest season Monte Carlo had ever known, Mademoiselle Fantôme was causing a sensation. Who was the exquisite "ghost", with her shining golden hair and dreaming dark eyes? Why did her formidable aunt guard her so carefully? Even Mademoiselle herself did not understand the seductive role she was playing. But her troubled young heart knew that evil was drawing close to her, that she was a pawn in a mysterious plot to avenge an old wrong.  Too late, she discovered that jealousy and bitterness were threatening to destroy her new-found love.

Film
The book was adapted for made-for-television film in 1990 starring Lysette Anthony, Marcus Gilbert, Sarah Miles and Oliver Reed.

Synopsis 
Eighteen-year-old Mistral is an innocent abroad in the sophisticated Côte D'Azur, Monte Carlo, where princes and millionaires mingle in the casinos and sumptuous hotels. Accompanied only by her embittered and domineering Aunt Emilie and kindly servant Jeanne, Mistral appears dressed all in grey like a ghost in the salons and ballrooms of Monte Carlo and sets Society's tongues wagging. It's not long before the whole of Monte Carlo are trying to find out who she really is, her waif-like beauty has men bewitched and falling in love – gentlemen such as Sir Robert Stanford. But on her aunt's bewildering but strict instructions, she must not converse with any but the Russian Prince Nikolai. Something about Mistral touches Sir Robert's heart – and he cannot understand why Mistral appears afraid to be with him. Yet both of them crave love. Only if Mistral's innocent eyes are finally opened to the truth – that Aunt Emilie's motives are borne not of concern for her niece but of bitterness and a hatred for men.

Ghost in Monte Carlo, A
Films shot at EMI-Elstree Studios
British drama films
Novels set in Monaco
British novels adapted into films
Rich & Cowan books